Anacleto Pinto (25 February 1948 – 21 March 2015) was a Portuguese long-distance runner. He competed in the marathon at the 1976 Summer Olympics and the 1980 Summer Olympics.

References

External links
 

1948 births
2015 deaths
Athletes (track and field) at the 1976 Summer Olympics
Athletes (track and field) at the 1980 Summer Olympics
Portuguese male long-distance runners
Portuguese male marathon runners
Olympic athletes of Portugal
People from Viseu
Sportspeople from Viseu District